John Brown's raid on Harpers Ferry was the largest event of 1859 in the United States, exacerbating the polarization of the country, and was a major factor in the secession of Southern states in 1861 and the subsequent outbreak of the American Civil War. In 1859, Brown was considered the most famous living American.

The raid on Harpers Ferry was a complicated affair. It ended with the taking of John Brown's Fort, but before that there were bodies floating down the Potomac, others dead along the Shenandoah. Unidentified corpses thrown in a packing box and dumped in a pit, and bodies taken away for dissection by medical students (see Burning of Winchester Medical College). It would be many years afterwards before even the names of all of the participants were known (see John Brown's raiders)..

Many of those present left their varying recollections of the events of those four days (October 16–19, 1859), as they experienced them. These include official reports, statements by the surviving members of Brown's party, statements from the prosecuting attorney Andrew Hunter, jailer John Avis, Marines, guards, hostages, bystanders, and even children who observed the events without participating in them.

Official reports
 Robert E. Lee's report (1859). Then-Colonel Robert E. Lee, in charge of the Marines who quickly broke down the engine house door and ended the raid, took the trouble to learn their identities. In his October 19 report, first published by the Senate investigative committee, he provides the name and home state of each of the raiders. He adds the rank in Brown's organization: captain, lieutenant, private; only the whites had ranks. According to him there were 19 men involved, described by him as 14 "insurgents" and 5 "negroes"; he did not mention the three at the Kennedy farm.
Col. Edward Shriver's report to Maryland Militia commander Brigadier General James Coale. (1859). Shriver was the commander of the 16th Regiment of Maryland Militia, which arrived in Harpers Ferry on October 17.
 U.S. Senate Select Committee (1860). In the Report of the Select Committee on the Harper's Ferry Invasion, often referred to as the Mason Report after the name of the committee chair, Virginia Senator James M. Mason, there is much testimony from residents of Harpers Ferry and others involved in or responding to Brown's activities. It includes Lee's report.

Members of Brown's party
 John Edwin Cook (1859). Cook was the only raider to confess, presumably under the pressure of his brother-in-law, the governor of Indiana, and the Attorney General of Indiana, who visited him in jail. His testimony in trial was taken down stenographically and published the next day, both of which presumably paid for by his brother-in-law. The focus is on the people involved, which is what the South wanted to know (as seen in the subsequent Mason report). The only stenographic record for the trials of John Brown and the other raiders is in the lengthy newspaper reports; at the time, reporters frequently studied shorthand.
 Osborne Anderson (1861). The only one of the raiders to leave a memoir was Osborne Anderson, author of A Voice from Harpers Ferry, although it attracted little attention. He was the only one of the five Blacks to survive, and thus the only good source for information about the Black participants, whom most white participants, including Brown, said little of. It also was written immediately after the events.
  Owen Brown (1874), the only one of Brown's sons to escape, avoided telling his story, and gave a single interview.
 Annie Brown (1903), his daughter, was the last person living who had been at the Kennedy farm (she had been, at 15, the youngest there), in 1903 shared some recollections with an interviewer.

Other eyewitnesses (in order of publication)
As Brown was, from 1859 until Lincoln's assassination in 1865, the most famous American, and his raid the subject of intense interest, many people's memories of him have been published. According to Brown expert Louis DeCaro, Jr., the newspaper interview—interviewing someone and making a newspaper article of it—begins with the stories on John Brown.

The following does not include the many sources that do not deal with the raid, such as general recollections of John Brown, or memories of him in Canada, Pennsylvania, Kansas, Iowa, or elsewhere, or the story of Watson Brown's body.

 Newspapers began publishing in October various signed and unsigned reports on the raid, the raiders, and the trials. For example, the entire first page and part of the second of the October 29th issue of the  Anti-Slavery Bugle are filled with brief reports on the raid. The Bugle compared the assault on Harpers Ferry with the Battle of Bunker Hill against the British, in 1775.
 David H. Strother, who lived in nearby Berkeley Springs, had special access because he was a nephew of prosecuting attorney Andrew Hunter, and also because he was a well-known sketch artist, under the name Porte Crayon. He was the correspondent of Harper's Weekly, which had published many of his sketches, and was present for the entirety of the event, from Monday morning the 16th, up to the execution on December 2. He published one piece on the raid; a longer version was not published until 1965, and its editor Eby takes it to be a draft. He published another on the trial. Harper's was criticized for these pices—Strother was no abolitionist, but he was strongly Unionist. His next writing in Harper's was unsigned, and it refused to publish his piece on tbe execution, which Boyd Stutler published in 1965.
  The abolitionist Rebecca Spring visited John Brown while he was in the Charles Town jail, and spoke less extensively with many others of Charles Town.
 
 Philadelphia lawyer John G. Rosengarten was a passenger on one of the trains that, on Monday, had to stop west of Harpers Ferry. On foot, he walked several miles to the town, was arrested as a Northerner and taken to the Charles Town jail (where he was protected from the angry, drunken crowd). Governor Wise knew him and ordered him released. With Strother, he saw Brown still in the engine house, and was present when Wise reviewed the documents brought from the Kennedy farm; he talked with many townspeople, including some of the hostages.
 Underground Railroad activist Alexander Milton Ross met with Governor Wise in Richmond while Brown was in jail. He published Recollections and Experiences of an Abolitionist in 1875.
 The recollections of Army officer J.E.B. Stuart, who was Robert E. Lee's aide-de-camp, were published in 1879.
 Alexander Boteler's essay, "Recollections of the John Brown raid, by a Virginian Who Witnessed the Fight" (1883), is followed immediately by the "Comment by a radical abolitionist", of Brown's biographer, Franklin Sanborn.
 John Daingerfield, the Paymaster's Clerk who was one of the hostages, wrote his recollections, published in 1885.
 Prosecuting Attorney Andrew Hunter wrote and published in 1887 his memoirs of the incident. The circuit judge and the out-of-town attorneys having left, it was he, as the leading lawyer of Jefferson County as well as Governor Henry A. Wise's personal attorney, who was in charge of everything local relating to Brown during his final month. It was Hunter who opened and read every letter addressed to Brown, retaining 70 to 80 that "he could not get, never would get, as I thought they were improper"; they were taken to Richmond along with the other documents. Hunter was at the head of the temporary system keeping non-locals without legitimate business out of the county. Hunter told the jailor Captain Avis to treat Brown well. In 1891 he published a longer verdion in a learned journal.
 Lt. Israel Greene led the company of Marines that broke down the door of Brown's fort. He was present on Tuesday and Wednesday. His recollections appeared in 1888. Robert McGlone calls this account "faulty" since it describes Greene subduing Brown, when Brown said he had surrendered.
 Parke Poindexter, a Virginia militia member who arrived in Harpers Ferry just after the storming of the engine house, and then guarded Brown and witnessed his execution, wrote about what he saw in a lengthy letter to his sister dated December 7, 1859, and published in 1889.
 William Fellows, a guard at the Charles Town jail, told his recollections to a reporter in 1898.
 G. A. Schoppert, an Armory employee who joined with the locals attaoking the engine house, published his recollections in 1900. It was he who shot one of Brown's sons and Lewis Sheridan Leary.
 J. W. Conrad, a young soldier stationed at Fort Monroe, published his recollections in 1900.
 Alexander McClure published his recollections in 1901. He was an abolitionist lawyer in Chambersburg, Pennsylvania, and publisher/editor of the Franklin Repository, an influential anti-slavery paper. Chambersburg was John Brown's "base of operations" while he was at the Kennedy Farm; mail and shipments for him were sent to Chambersburg. "I saw him nearly every day for several weeks in the crowd that usually assembled about the post offlce before the arrival of the evening mail." Two days before the raid, Francis Meriam, accompanied by John Henry Kagi, appeared in McClure's office to make a will.
 William A. Martin, one of the two members of Brown's jury still alive at that time, published his recollections in 1901.
 Jennie Chambers was a small girl, walking Monday morning from her home in Bolivar to the young ladies' school in Harpers Ferry; her father was in the militia. Her recollections, which appeared in 1902, show the influence of others' writing or speaking about Brown, but there are several details not found elsewhere. It also exists as an undated pamphlet.

 Joseph Barry's Strange Story of Harper's Ferry appeared in 1903. Barry says on the cover that he was "a resident of the place [Harpers Ferry] for half a century". His book was intended for sale to tourists among others, as it has advertisements for a hotel with steam heat and electric lights, a suggestion that the visitor visit the Dime Museum, and fishing guides and bait available on short notice. 50 pages are on Brown's raid, and Brown's picture is on the cover. The book has been reprinted locally several times.
 A lengthy statement of Cleon Moore, who lived in Charles Town, participated in the militia, and attended Brown's and Cook's trials and Brown's execution, appeared in 1904. He appears as the notary on John Avis's statement, cited below.
 The widow of John H. Zittle, editor–publisher of the Shepherdstown Register and a member of the Shepherdstown militia, published in 1905 his A Correct History of the John Brown Invasion at Harper's Ferry, containing "a living picture of the occurrences as they appeared to the people of the community at that time". He had no direct knowledge of the raiders' identities.
  Avey was a boy in Charles Town (p. 11).
 Rev. Samuel Leech, then a Methodist Episcopal minister of 22 who lived "within a half mile of Harper's Ferry" (p. 4), was an eyewitness starting Monday, and once visited the prisoners in jail, though Brown would not see him. "I was told that Brown had ordered out of his room a Presbyterian minister named Lowrey when he had proposed to offer prayer. He had also said to my first colleague, Rev. James H. March, 'You do not know the meaning of the word Christianity. Of course I regard you as a gentleman, but only as a heathen gentleman.' I was advised to say nothing to him about prayer" (p. 12). Leech published his recollections in 1909.
 A lengthy notarized statement by Deputy Sheriff and jailor John Avis, who was much "vexed" at what he called misquotations of him, was prepared in 1882 and first published in 1909. The transcription in Villard's 1910 biography is to be preferred.
 John Allstadt, Jr., who with his father was among the hostages, published his recollections in 1909.
 The recollections of M. A. Marquette, who lived in Harpers Ferry and worked at the Armory, were published posthumously in 1916.
 Simpson K. Donovan was the first reporter to reach Harpers Ferry, arriving with the Marines on Monday afternoon. He remained there until the prisoners were moved to Charles Town, then went there himself and remained until Brown's execution. His recollections were published in 1921.
 Willard Chambers Gompf was a boy living near the Armory that saw first-hand many of the events, and whose uncle was a hostage. He published his recollections in 1929.
 Charles White, who was an eyewitness starting Monday the 17th, wrote his recollections, first published in 1959.
 Planter and pro-slavery activist Edmund Ruffin was in Charles Town and Harpers Ferry from November 26 through December 8, and witnessed the execution. His diary was published in 1972.
 Father Costello, the Catholic priest Brown refused to see, wrote his recollections, which were published in 1974.
 1859 letters from George and Mary Mauzy, residents of Harpers Ferry (2015?).

References

John Brown's raid on Harpers Ferry
Virginia-related lists
1859-related lists